Middle North Falls, is a waterfall located in the Silver Falls State Park at the east end of the city of Salem, in Marion County, in the U.S. state of Oregon. It is located in a privileged area on the west foothills where Mount Hood National Forest meets with the Middle Santiam Wilderness. Several prominent waterfalls are located in the Park along Trail of Ten Falls: South Falls, Lower South Falls, Drake Falls, and Lower North Falls—among others.

Location 
Middle North Falls is created along the course of the North Fork Silver Creek and it sits on the north section of Silver Falls State Park Trail of Ten Falls, along Winter Falls Loop. Middle North Falls is one of four waterfalls in the Park that features a separate trail behind waterfall. The trail leading behind Middle North Falls is a dead-end, constructed purely to allow access to additional views of the waterfall.

See also 
 List of waterfalls in Oregon

References 

Parks in Marion County, Oregon
Waterfalls of Oregon